The 2022 Farah Palmer Cup season is the 16th season of the competition. The regular season ran from 16 July to 28 August, with the playoffs running from 3 to 10 September. Canterbury won their fifth title after defeating Auckland in the Premiership final and Hawke's Bay won their first Championship title after beating Otago 24–20 at the Clutha Showgrounds in Balclutha.

Format
The Farah Palmer Cup standings are sorted by a competition points system. Four points are awarded to the winning team, a draw earns two points, whilst a loss amounts to zero points. Unions can also win their side a respectable bonus point. To receive a bonus point, they must score four tries or more, or lose by seven points or less. Each team is placed on their total points received. If a tiebreaker is necessary, when two or more teams finish on equal points, the union who acquired more competition points against the other tied team(s) gets placed higher. In the case that separation is still not made, the winner of the head-to-head result between the teams will get rights to be ranked above. This seeding format was only implemented for the 2020 competition.

The regular season consists of two types of matches. Each union play home or away games against each team from their division, making a total of six competition games during the regular season for each union in the North pool, and five regular season games for those in the South pool. The finals format sees the top two teams from each pool qualify for cross-over semi-finals. The top placed teams in each pool, based on table points, receive a home semi-final. In the first round of the finals, the semi-finals, the top placed North team is to host the second-placed South team, and the first-placed South team is to host the Second placed North team. The final is to be hosted by the top remaining seed.

Standings

Standings progression

Regular season
The 2021 Farah Palmer Cup was played across nine weeks. The competition started on Saturday, 16 July, with Wellington hosting a match against Canterbury.

Week 1

Bye: Bay of Plenty, Championship Teams

Week 2

Bye: Waikato

Week 3

Bye: Canterbury

Week 4

Bye: Wellington

Week 5

Bye: Auckland

Week 6

Bye: Counties Manukau; Tasman and Hawke's Bay game cancelled

Week 7

Bye:

Play-offs

Championship

Premiership

Semi-finals
Championship Semi-finals

Premiership Semi-finals

Finals
Championship Final

Premiership Final

JJ Stewart Trophy

The JJ Stewart Trophy is a trophy based on a challenge system, rather than a league or knockout competition as with most football trophies. The holding union must defend the trophy in challenge matches, and if a challenger defeats them, they become the new holder of the trophy.

Canterbury started the season as holders of the trophy and as such, were obligated to place the trophy up for challenge in all of their regular season home games.

Successful JJ Stewart Trophy challenges were played by Canterbury in Round 3, Round 5 and Round 7 against Otago, Wellington and Tasman respectively.

References

External links

Farah Palmer Cup
Farah Palmer Cup
Farah Palmer Cup
September 2022 sports events in New Zealand
October 2022 sports events in New Zealand
Women's rugby union competitions in New Zealand